The AMC Concord is a compact car manufactured and marketed by the American Motors Corporation for model years 1978–1983. The Concord was essentially a revision of the AMC Hornet that was discontinued after 1977, but more luxurious, quieter, roomier, and smoother-riding than the series it replaced. It was offered in four-door sedan, two-door coupé (through 1982), three-door hatchback (through 1979), and five-door station wagon configurations. The Concord was AMC's volume seller from the time it appeared until the introduction of the Renault Alliance.

The car was available as a sports-oriented two-door hatchback AMX model without any "Concord" badges or identification for the 1978 model year, as well as the Concord Sundancer convertible during 1981 and 1982, an authorized conversion sold through AMC dealers.

Vehiculos Automotores Mexicanos (VAM) assembled and marketed modified Concord versions in Mexico as the VAM American, including a unique VAM Lerma model. An electric variant of the Concord station wagons were marketed independently from AMC by Solargen during 1979–1980.

Origin and development 

American Motors was unable to develop a completely new car to replace its successful, but aging, Hornet. The competition was expected from the new Ford Fox platform (also introduced for 1978 as the Fairmont and Zephyr). The rear-wheel drive GM A platform (RWD) intermediates such as the Chevrolet Malibu were to be downsized to the same  wheelbase as the Hornet for the 1978 model year as well, following the previous shrinking of full-size GM models. Therefore, the smallest domestic American automaker needed something fresh to continue competing in a class that had long been their core market segment. The 1978 Concord offered slightly revised styling, higher level of appointments and features, and an emphasis on workmanship and quality prompted by the growing success of cars imported from Japan. The transformation of the old Hornet into the new 1978 Concord included promoting the new model as an upscale luxury compact with competitive starting price in the mid-US$4,000 range (adjusted only for inflation equivalent to US$ in  dollars).

The U.S. automobile industry has had a place "for a small company deft enough to exploit special market segments left untended by the giants" and under the leadership of "Gerald C. Meyers, AMC transformed the austere old Hornet into the handsomer Concord." Dick Teague, AMC's top car designer, utilized the facelifted 1977 Gremlin's front fenders with a new hood over a chrome six-section egg-crate grille incorporating white rectangular parking lights, as well as new rectangular headlights, bumpers, fiberglass rear fender end caps, rectangular tri-color taillights, and a stand-up hood ornament with a new Concord emblem. On cars with the optional D/L package, the roof featured an outlined quarter-vinyl cover that was available in matching or contrasting colors.

The new model featured increased sound insulation and suspension upgrades to isolate the interior from vibration and noise. The new compact car's luxury ride - "aiming at a virtually noiseless boulevard ride" was engineered by isolating the front suspension and rear axle from the car. All Concord models included special insulation in the dashboard and front floor, as well as sound-deadening coatings to all areas where plastic components joined. Top models also came with molded fiberglass acoustical headlining and sound absorption pads behind all interior panels.

The Concord also came with numerous standard comfort and upscale features, gaining an inch (25.4 mm) of rear-seat headroom, as well as two additional inches (50.8 mm) of rear passenger legroom. An advantage of using the aging and heavy Hornet design was its body stiffness and safety performance. Crash tests conducted by the National Highway Traffic Safety Administration (NHTSA) showed the probability of injury in a struck vehicle to range from a low of nine percent for the four-door AMC Concord to a high of 97 percent for the two-door Nissan Sentra.

American Motors was increasingly turning to the rapidly growing four-wheel-drive market, but most of the press coverage for the 1978 model year "was focused on AMC's new Concord luxury compact car, which was a sign that even then reporters still considered automobiles more important than Jeeps." The new Concord was popular with consumers by outselling all the other AMC car lines combined for its 1978 inaugural year.

Annual changes

1978 

In its inaugural model year, the Concord models were available in base and the top-line D/L in four body styles.

The base model sedan Concords retained the previous Hornet's two-door and four-door sedan rooflines, but incorporated the new front and rear-end styling, as well as the other mechanical improvements.

The D/L featured many of the luxury cues that were popular on cars in the 1970s; a "landau" vinyl roof with opera windows (coupe only), color-keyed wheel covers, reclining seats covered in velveteen cloth, and woodgrain instrument panel overlays. The D/L wagon featured exterior woodgrain trim and reclining seats in a leather-like perforated vinyl.

Available exclusively on D/L wagons was a Touring Wagon package. It included a special beige interior with orange, and brown accents on the seat upholstery, door panels, dash trim, and exterior bodyside molding. Carpeting was extra thick 24 oz. throughout and the steering wheel was wrapped in beige leather. The D/L wagon's exterior wood trim panels were not available. The Touring Wagon package came in only four exterior colors with matching painted full wheel covers: Alpine White, Sand Tan, Golden Ginger, and Mocha Brown.

The Sport package included slot-style road wheels and bodyside tape stripes on the lower half of the vehicle, running up around the wheel flares.

A special AMX model was available only on the liftback bodystyle and featured unique trim as well as performance enhancements. This was a one-year compact-sided version as the AMX moved to the sub-compact Spirit platform for 1979.

The  I6 engine was standard, with the  six-cylinder and a  V8 being optional on the D/L models. Transmission options included a three-speed manual, a three-speed automatic, or a floor-shifted manual four-speed.

American Motors also introduced an optional Volkswagen/Audi-designed 2.0 L (122 cu in) I4 engine, which was also available in the Gremlin and later the Spirit. The engine was the same as used in the Porsche 924, although the Porsche was fitted with Bosch fuel injection instead of the carburetors on the AMC models. This engine provided improved economy, but was not as powerful as the standard six-cylinder engine. Because of the expense of acquiring the rights to the new 2.0 L engine, AMC could not afford to make it standard equipment.

American Motors marketed the Concord as a more economical alternative to larger luxury cars. The tag line in the ads at the time of Concord's introduction touted it as the car with "The luxury America wants, the size America needs." The most popular body style was the two-door coupe accounting for almost half of total Concord production in 1978. The Concord outsold AMC's other passenger models (Pacer, Matador, and Gremlin) combined in its first year in the marketplace.

A Popular Science comparison of four new compact sedans concluded that AMC's aim "hit the mark" at car buyers switching to smaller cars. The AMC Concord earned "top honors for trim level" with its luxury, reclining seats covered in velvet-like fabric "front seats that would do a Cadillac proud", as well as its "in-line six is similar to a V8 in a number of respects, including smoothness, power, and noise levels." High-quality materials and attractive dash design "would have you thinking this was an expensive car were it for one thing: poor quality control." Compared to the Ford Fairmont, Plymouth Volaré, and Pontiac Phoenix, the 1978 compact cars offer more variety and "especially the Concord, are more refined than ever and make lots of sense as family cars."

Owners in a nationwide survey conducted by Popular Mechanics magazine responded that they liked their AMC Concords based on their combined  of driving. Drivers reported "few and rather minor gripes". When asked to name their complaints, 30% of AMC Concord owners wrote none, thus beating the record of all the 17 automobiles that were surveyed by the magazine in 1977 by a wide margin - including the Honda Accord (with only an 18.9% "no complaints" rate).

1979 

The 1979 model year saw moderate upgrades to the Concord. Front-end styling changed appreciably with a "waterfall" grille with a fine chrome vertical bar treatment, quad rectangular headlights atop slim, wide clear parking and signal lights, and lighter aluminum bumpers were new for 1979. The D/L sedan was given a new vinyl roof design which extended only over the rear passenger compartment was complemented by chrome trim that overlaid the B-pillar and wrapped over the vinyl roof at its leading edge. A thin trim piece at the roof's edge simulated a convertible's fold-down hinge point. The D/L package, now the middle trim level, was extended to the hatchback, which was given a brushed aluminum Targa-like roof band and a half-vinyl roof to differentiate it from the base model hatchback.

The 1979 model year introduced the "Limited" model, available in the coupe, sedan, and station wagon models. It included leather upholstery, thick carpeting, full courtesy lighting, body-colored wheel covers, and a standard AM radio. The Concord Limited was well equipped for a compact car at the time.

Special versions of Concords were built to contracts and fleet orders that had minimal trim and options as well as rear-seat delete and rear doors with non-opening windows and no interior door handles.

The Sport package was dropped for 1979, as was the AMX version that became available in the new AMC Spirit liftback body. The three-speed manual transmission was a "downgrade" option for Concord in 1979. The  V8 engine was available, but not popular.

On May 1, 1979, AMC celebrated the 25th anniversary of the Nash-Hudson merger and released a limited number of specially appointed "Silver Anniversary" AMC Concords to commemorate the event. The limited production models received a two-tone silver metallic finish, silver vinyl roof, wire wheel covers, commemorative badges, and the interior upholstered in black or russet "Caberfae" corduroy.

A Popular Science road test of three traditional compact cars (AMC Concord, Ford Fairmont, and Plymouth Volaré) facing the challenge of GM's new front-wheel drive "X cars" (Chevrolet Citation and Oldsmobile Omega) summarized that AMC was committed to serve market segments not served by the other domestic automakers, and concluded that "Concord is the best-looking inside, and offers the plush feel of a big, expensive sedan."

The Concord line sales totaled more than 100,000 units during a year when the imported Japanese were gaining market share and new competing domestic models were changing to front-wheel drive.

1980 

The hatchback was discontinued for 1980, as was the three-speed manual transmission. The design of the Concord models were given a smoother appearance. The sedan versions of the D/L and Limited were given full vinyl roofs with nearly triangular opera windows embedded in the C-pillars; the coupe versions received squared-off opera windows and revised chrome opera window trim with vertical strakes occupying the space between the window itself and the outer piece of trim. Limited wagons received blackout paint and chrome trim surrounding their rear quarter windows. Base sedans and coupes retained the same rooflines and treatment seen on Hornets since 1970. Taillights were modified and given a wraparound treatment. All Concords received a new horizontal bar grille, with the Concord name in script to the driver's side, and a new, squared-off hood ornament bearing the AMC tri-color logo. That same year, options such as power windows and power seats were also made available.

General Motors' Iron Duke I4 engine was also made available for 1980 to replace the rarely ordered VW/Audi four. The  V8 and  I6 engines were discontinued for 1980, leaving only the outsourced  I4 and AMC's durable  I6 engines as the available choices.

All AMCs were treated with Ziebart Factory Rust Protection for 1980. Changes included the use of aluminized trim screws, plastic inner fender liners, galvanized steel in every exterior body panel, and a deep-dip (up to the window line) bath in epoxy-based primer. AMC backed up the rust protection of the Concords with a new five-year "No Rust Thru" transferable warranty. This was in addition to the comprehensive "buyer protection plan", a twelve month/ warranty with loaner car and trip interruption protection that AMC introduced in 1972 that covered everything on the car except the tires.

Although it was the oldest design and equipped with the biggest engine in a group of station wagons that were road tested by Popular Science, the Concord recorded the best acceleration and fuel economy figures (compared to Chevrolet Malibu, Chrysler LeBaron, and Ford Fairmont). The test and driving report summarized that for many customers, the versatile six-cylinder automobiles like the AMC Concord wagon, were excellent substitutes for full-size cars.

1981 

The 1981 Concord was "the most luxurious of all the U.S. compacts". A new grille treatment was featured at the front. It consisted of chrome horizontal bars spaced further apart than in 1980 and added three vertical bars, one in the center and two were outboard that divided the two halves into quarters. Noryl wheel covers embodying a pseudo-starfish pattern were new to the options list. The opera window on two-door sedans was slightly redesigned as well. 

The biggest change for the 1981 Concord was the availability of a four-cylinder engine, the  Iron Duke engine supplied by General Motors. The new I4 engine achieved top fuel efficiency when combined with a four-speed manual, but did not really suit the car's character. This was the result "of those fuel-economy-obsessed years." However, this engine had "enough torque available at low revs to pull a small house." Fuel economy figures for the 49 state versions in 1981 were:
  city and  highway for the four-cylinder with four-speed manual

Popular Science magazine highly recommended AMC's I6 "well-proven power plant" compared to the newly standard four-cylinder engine. The Concord that was comarison road tested had the  engine and the car achieved better acceleration compared to the considerably smaller-engined Dodge Aries, Chevrolet Citation, and Mercury Zephyr.

Three trim levels were offered: base, DL, and Limited in three body styles. There were four available road wheel designs. The full "custom" wheel covers were standard on the Base model, full styled wheel covers (stainless steel) were standard on Concord DL, simulated wire wheel covers were standard on Limited models, and the 14×7 inch "Turbocast II" aluminum wheels were optional on all 1981 models. A total of 15 exterior paint colors were available: Olympic white, classic black, quick silver metallic, steel gray metallic, medium blue metallic, moonlight blue, autumn gold, Sherwood green metallic, cameo tan, copper brown metallic, medium brown metallic, dark brown metallic, Oriental red, vintage red metallic, and deep maroon metallic.

The AMC Concord offered interiors that looked expensive and were comfortable and finished to a level equal in appearance to expensive American luxury cars. Even without the top-line "Limited" upgrade, the Concord "was trimmed in first-class fashion". Interiors were available in "deluxe grain" vinyl in black, blue, beige, and nutmeg. Sculptured "Rochelle velour" fabric came in black, blue, wine, beige, and nutmeg. Leather was available only in nutmeg. Station wagons were available with simulated woodgrain lower body side trim.

American Motors had a "quicker erosion" problem compared to the other automakers. To help mitigate this, AMC increased its 1981 advertising budget by 15% to $51 million. It used TV as the major medium on behalf of its cars, Renaults, and Jeeps. All AMCs cars were marketed as the "Tough Americans" in print and television advertisements, indicating the presence of fully galvanized steel bodies, aluminized exhausts, and the comprehensive Ziebart rust protection processes included from the factory. Revenue for AMC in 1981 increased, but unit sales of both cars and Jeeps decreased. Sales of Concords for 1981 in the U.S market totaled 59,838. Overseas markets saw a sales increase for cars as well as Jeeps.

1982 
Changes for 1982 were minor, as well. Popular Mechanics noted that it is difficult to distinguish the 1982 cars from their 1981 counterparts because for the first time in history, AMC has not made appearance changes. The DL and Limited coupes saw the removal of the vertical strakes on their Landau vinyl roofs. The Chrysler-designed 3-speed automatic transmission received wider ratios, and low-drag disc brakes were also added, both as fuel economy measures. The  I6 engine now featured a serpentine belt system.

1983 

Concord coupes were dropped from the line for 1983, as well as the  I4 engine. The top-of-the-line Limited sedan model was dropped leaving the base and DL four-door sedans and base, DL, and Limited wagons in the Concord line. All Concords came with the  I6 engine and the cars included more standard equipment for their last model year.

Sales slowed in the wake of the introduction of the Renault Alliance, which were more modern, space-efficient, fuel-efficient 4-cylinder, front-wheel-drive cars compared to the rear-drive Concord with its aging platform. The imported Renault 18-based 18i sedan Sportwagon sold by AMC/Jeep/Renault dealers were also more efficient replacements. All Concord and Spirit models were quietly dropped by the end of the 1983 model year. The future for AMC's Concord and Spirit series was sealed for the 1980s as rear-drive cars were replaced by front-drive models.

Production Figures:

AMX 

Reviving a name that was associated with the performance two-seat AMC AMX sports car that was introduced 10 years earlier, AMC fielded a new model in the youth and performance market segment. Based on the Concord hatchback model, the new AMX became a separate series for 1978. The car did not have Concord badges or identification, but the coupe represented "the performance expression of the Concord line" by automotive journalists. Rather than just an option package as on the 1977 Hornet hatchback model, AMC emphasized the distinction between its new luxury-oriented Concords and the sports car image of the new AMX by separating the models in its 1978 sales literature.

In contrast to the Concord hatchback, the AMX version included a different front fascia with single round headlights, a flush grille, round amber parking lights, and a "power bulge" hood that was also used on the Gremlin. Engines included the standard  I6 with 4-speed manual or optional 3-speed automatic floor shift transmission, or the optional  V8 with a 3-speed automatic. A factory  V8 with a 4-speed manual could have been a special order example.

The AMX included performance DR78×14 black sidewall steel-belted radial tires, front sway bar, vinyl bucket seats, a center floor console, "rally gauges" with tachometer, brushed aluminum instrument panel overlays, black "soft-feel" sports steering wheel, and special trim on the door panels with map pockets. The standard interior color selection was limited to black, blue, or beige, with optional upholstery in the "Levi's" Trim Package.

The exterior featured a blacked-out grille, headlight bezels, rear window molding, door and quarter window frames, rear license plate depression, and wiper arms, a black front air dam, black front and rear fender flares, dual flat black rear-view mirrors, black rear window louvers, black body side scuff moldings, silver "targa" roof band, contrasting "AMX" decals on the bodyside ahead of the rear wheel openings, silver slot-styled steel wheels, as well as body painted bumpers with black rubber guards and scuff moldings.

Exterior colors were limited to Alpine White, Firecracker Red, Sunshine Yellow, Quick Silver Metallic, or Classic Black. Only the black painted versions included gold body side stripes that continued up and over the roof band, as well as gold paint accents for the standard slot-styled wheels. A carryover 1977 Hornet AMX decal was available for the rear deck and hood, in either gold with orange or black with gold. Polished forged aluminum 5-spoke road wheels were optional.

According to automotive journalist, Michael Lamm, the new AMX had "noticeably tighter shocks and gives a firm and comfortable ride"; "corner[s] with the very best" with little lean, as well as the standard six-cylinder engine that combines good performance with fuel economy, and the four-speed "gearbox that's fun to use and has long, long gears." The automaker's marketing campaign for the new AMX included a separate dealer promotional video focusing on the youthfulness and fun to drive characteristics. Product placement of the 1978 AMX included the Wonder Woman TV series. Approximately 2,500 AMXs were built for the 1978 model year.

The AMXs "great styling combined with over-the-top graphics and competent handling" make them "bone fide collectable" cars today, despite a lack of "serious muscle."

Convertibles 

A Sundancer convertible conversion by Griffith Company was available for the 1981 and 1982 model years. The Sundancer was available one year before the introduction of the 1982 Chrysler LeBaron convertible.

The modifications to the Concord started with a two-door sedan monocoque (unitized) body. To add strength to the platform after the removal of its roof, fourteen steel reinforcements were welded to the undercarriage and a steel targa roll bar was welded to the door pillars for rigidity, as well as additional passenger compartment protection. The front section of the roof (ahead of the targa bar) was a removable lightweight fiberglass hatch, while the rear section of polyvinyl material folded and included a tonneau cover for use in the down position.

The cars were available through any AMC dealer, but less than 200 conversions were manufactured (Concord and four-wheel-drive Eagle versions).

VAM models 
The Mexican government-owned automaker Vehiculos Automotores Mexicanos (VAM) manufactured a number of models in Mexico under license from AMC. The made-in-Mexico vehicles had to have at least 60% locally sourced parts. The cars came with different trim, interiors than the equivalent AMC-made models. It was sold as the VAM American. In addition to rebadged Concords, VAM developed model was the VAM Lerma that was based on the 2- and 4-door Concord sedan platform with the addition of the AMC Spirit's hatchback and rear design with unique Lerma quarter glass.

All engines built by VAM were of AMC design incorporating appropriate changes to deal with lower octane gasoline and the higher altitudes in Mexico. This included a unique  version of AMC's straight-6 engine. The four-cylinder engines, the V8, and the subsequent five-speed manual transmissions were not available. The three-speed manual transmission continued as the standard unit in all three base models through 1983, while the four-speed manual was restricted to performance models only. All three high-trim versions were limited the three-speed automatic as standard and only choice. The hatchback models were not available in base or DL trim, nor for the Griffith-converted Sundancer models.

1978
The Concord-based VAM American started as the "second generation" of the economy and luxury line of intermediate VAM compacts, the first generation being the 1975-1977 Hornet-based Americans. The 1978 base models were called "American sedan" and "Camioneta American" by VAM, despite the that they had no designation. The standard  I6 engine came with a single-barrel carburetor and three-speed manual transmission with column-shift on the wagon and four-door, or a floor-shift on the two-door. A three-speed automatic transmission was optional with the column-mounted shifter in all three body styles; and ordering it included power steering, bumper guards, and the heater without extra cost in both sedan models. As for the base wagon, which had the heater regularly as standard, got a full high-trim upgrade included with the order of the automatic transmission. The four-door sedan and wagon featured a front bench seat, while the two-door sedan included low-back individual non-reclining seats. Standard were non-power brakes with front disks and rear drums, front sway bar, manual steering, a 3.31:1 rear differential gear ratio, plain blacked-out dashboard,  dual speedometer, fixed three-point front seatbelts (retractable on the base wagon), inside hood release, front ashtray, lighter, locking glove box, AM radio with antenna, rear ashtrays, round dome light, electric two-speed wipers, electric washers, flat volcano hubcaps with exposed lug nuts, "American" fender emblems, "4.2" rear quarter emblems, manual driver's side remote mirror, base steering wheel and roof rack (wagon only). Aside from the aforementioned automatic transmission, factory optional equipment included power brakes, power steering (with manual transmission), stiffer springs and shocks, wheel trim rings, sports steering wheel, luxury steering wheel, passenger's side remote mirror, tinted windshield, parcel shelf (standard on wagon), bright molding package, bumper guards (with manual transmission), and heater (for manual sedans).

The top of the line models were named American GFS (Concord DL two-door), American ECD (Concord DL four-door), and Camioneta American Automática (Concord DL wagon). All three featured automatic transmissions, power brakes, power steering,  six-cylinder (258 on ECD) with new-for-the-year Motorcraft two-barrel carburetor and 8.0:1 compression ratio, 3.07:1 rear differential gear ratio, light group (courtesy, ashtray, glove box, hood, and trunk; the last one unavailable on the wagon), custom steering wheel, woodgrain panels on dashboard, parcel shelf, clock, retractable seat belts, luxury upholstery, tinted windshield, bright molding package (wheel arches, drip rails, rocker panels, front hood edge, hood ornament), engine displacement "4.6" emblems ("4.2" on ECD), wheel covers, and bumper guards. The GFS model included a floor-shift transmission and reclining individual high-back seats, while the ECD and automatic wagon had column-shift coupled with a bench front seat. Both sedan models incorporated vinyl roofs either in full form (ECD) or Landau type (GFS). The most unusual looking of these models in contrast with AMC's versions was the GFS model as it incorporated the flip-open rear side opera windows and the Targa band used in the 1977 AMC Hornet AMX models (the same treatment used in the Hornet-based 1977 VAM American GFS). The optional equipment list on these models included an air conditioning system with heavy-duty cooling (seven-blade flexible fan, three-line radiator, fan shroud, coolant recovery tank, and 55 amp alternator), reading dome light, remote-controlled driver's side mirror, passenger's side remote mirror, and rear defroster.

1979
For 1979 all versions of the American came with the redesigned aluminum bumpers with plastic side end caps, dual quad headlights over a transparent parking light, and the "waterflow" plastic grille. The station wagon with automatic transmission obtained a new designation and became the Camioneta American DL. The American GFS got a treatment more similar to its AMC counterpart with the removal of the Targa band retaining the Landau half-vinyl top. The side opera windows were changed to fixed units, which incorporated a unique VAM-designed sandblasted GFS emblem. Both the base and high-trim versions incorporated a shared new design of side panels, the only difference between them being a low carpet insert and map pouches for the top-end models, showing for the first time a partial difference between upholstery of both trim levels. All units with column-mounted shifters and automatic transmission obtained a new gear indicator integrated into the speedometer, replacing the previous unit fixed on top of the steering column. The flip-style digital clock was replaced by a quartz electronic one. The list of optional equipment was expanded with the possibility of ordering a monaural AM/FM radio on the ECD and DL wagon, which became standard on the GFS. No wheel covers were offered this year, thus the luxury editions incorporated bright narrow volcano hubcaps with VAM a logo and wheel trim rings. The custom steering wheel got a new design for the year with a soft rectangular button and a small metal VAM emblem.

It showcased a 302 duration degree camshaft (266° stock camshaft), 8.5:0 compression ratio (8.0:1 stock), a Holley 2300 two-barrel carburetor (Motorcraft 2150 stock 282 carburetor), semiported engine head, headers with dual final outlets and exhausts, Prestolite electronic distributor with modified advance curves for higher acceleration, reinforced rebalanced crankshaft and a clutch fan (seven-bladed flexible stock heavy duty cooling fan). This engine is the evolution of VAM's earlier Go Pack 282 engine from the early 1970s. What allowed this engine to be commercialized was an exemption in emission certification of up to 500 engine units per year, thus setting the cornerstone of this special edition.

The special model came standard with power brakes with front disks, power steering, front sway bar, heavy-duty suspension (stiffer springs and shocks), TREMEC 170-F four-speed manual transmission with Hurst linkage, Spicer model 44 rear differential with a 3.31:1 gear ratio, heavy-duty cooling (coolant recovery tank, fan shroud, and three-line radiator), leather-wrapped three-arm sports steering wheel, reclining high-back bucket seats, dynamic three-point front seat belts, center console with armrest and Rallye gauges (clock, vacuum meter, ammeter and oil pressure) with ashtray for the rear seat occupants, digital tachometer, woodgrain panels on dashboard, parcel shelf, full light group (except dome), AM radio with a passenger-side rear quarter panel-mounted antenna, dual remote-controlled body-colored mirrors, high trim upholstery with map pouches and carpet inserts on the door panels (shared with the GFS and Rally AMX models), tinted windshield, blacked-out bumpers, VAM-designed sports steel grille, sports steel eight-spoke 14×6 wheels with blacked-out volcano hubcaps, and D70×14 radial tires. The "Hornet in Flames" decal design used by AMC for the 1977 and 1978 AMXs was used in the 06/S over both the hood and trunk lid alongside large white "06 / S" decals over each quarter panel. Factory options on this vehicle were a sunroof, rear defroster, reading dome light, and an AM/FM radio. Only 499 units were produced, making it the most collectible Concord-based model for Mexico and practically the local equivalent of the 1971 Hornet SC/360 model. It was replaced with the Spirit coupe-based Rally GT model starting in 1980.

1980
The 1980 VAM Americans incorporated all changes designed by AMC for the Concord that included full-length tail lights, vertical rectangular opera windows on the GFS (continuing the sandblasted "GFS" emblem of the previous year), C-pillar windows on the ECD (with their respective sandblasted emblem as well), and the availability of simulated wood bodyside trim for the American DL wagon for the first time. All versions came with a VAM-designed grille made of aluminum, first time showcasing a front end design different from the AMC originals. Once again, the high-trim models incorporated standard wheelcovers. The type used being the Argent polyurethane design with the AMC logo on the centercap replaced by a VAM one, meaning VAM's first-ever use of wheelcovers that were not entirely made of metal. For the first time, the three top-end models came standard with dual remote mirrors with remote controls, being the shell-like semioval design in body color, which were optional equipment in the previous years. The American ECD came with the  six as standard equipment for the first time (including the rear quarter panel emblem change to the "4.6" units), meaning that all high-trim VAM Americans were powered by the largest I6 engine from this point ahead. Equipment that became standard for the year included a flexible seven-blade fan and three-line radiator in all engines, this being half of the heavy duty cooling package.

All models featured as standard equipment a locking gas cap, a new  speedometer and front seat adjustable headrests regardless of trim level. The high-end models became the first VAM cars ever to be available with intermittent wipers, power door locks, power windows, power trunk release (ECD and GFS only), electric antenna, and an AM/FM stereo radio (instead of the previous year's monaural units), creating the longest list of optional equipment in the history of the VAM American line until this point. A lighted vanity mirror and safety reflectors fixed onto the front door armrests were new-for-the-year standard equipment for the three top-end models. For the first time, door and side panels included a curved plastic portion on their top part to cover the body-colored sheetmetal under the side rear windows and door glass that was previously covered only by a sheet of glued texturized vinyl that was color-keyed to the interior in the 1978 and 1979 models. Improved, more luxurious B-pillar and headliner side moldings also debuted on the high-trim units. The American GFS switched to column-shifted transmission control retaining the individual reclining seat configuration. In regards to the three base models, they all included the heater as standard equipment regardless of transmission type, as well as high back front seats; marking the end of low back seats in VAM cars. The base models' interior side and door panels kept the same design and treatment of the previous year's. The base American wagon got the power steering system as standard equipment. The custom steering wheel became the standard unit in all six models, the only difference between the ones used in the high-trim models and the base ones being the metal rectangular woodgrain molding surrounding the padded horn button.

1981
The Lerma is introduced, an original adaptation combining the central and front portions of the VAM American sedan with the rear third of the smaller Rally coupe creating a line of three- and five-door hatchbacks in a European style. It was intended to be VAM's most luxurious model and new flagship product of the company, the first since the 1976 VAM Classic DPL (AMC Matador sedan in the U. S. and Canada). The VAM American for 1981 in high trim obtained a notable improvement as a luxury vehicle. All three bodies included as standard equipment a rear defroster, reading dome lights, intermittent wipers, dual remote-controlled mirrors (new-for-the-year AMC squared chromed design), and AM/FM stereo radio as the main novelties. The options list now added a tilt steering column and power seats. The previous year's side panels with texturized vinyl top were replaced by new high trim fabric units keeping the carpet inserts but no longer having the map pouches. All units regardless of trim level had the AMC-designed Spirit grille for the year along with fan shroud and coolant recovery tank as standard equipment regardless of the presence of the air conditioning system, meaning the full standardization of the heavy duty cooling system in VAM cars. Appearance changes included "Noryl" wheel covers replacing the Argent design for the high-trim versions.

The base models were upgraded, and ordering any of the three body styles with the automatic transmission now included as standard equipment without extra charge: a quartz digital clock, retractable seat belts, tinted windshield, parcel shelf, full light group (courtesy, ashtray, glove box, hood, trunk lid) except reading dome light, woodgrain panels applied on the dashboard, wheel trim rings, full bright molding package (front hood edge, rocker panels, wheel lips, drip rails) except the central hood unit with the VAM ornament, and protective rubber side moldings aside from the already existing power steering and bumper guards. This meant a semi-equipped mid-range model between the standard basic units and the GFS/ECD/DL ones. This created for the first time an automatic base wagon that was not a DL. In 1981 and 1982, there were four versions of the station wagon model: base manual, base automatic, basic DL, and equipped DL. Despite this change, VAM did not create any designation or distinction for the new better-equipped base models. This was a new marketing technique focused on making more customers request optional accessories, being the common situation at the time that most would buy the cars just as they were at the dealership floor without looking forward to upgrade them in any form. This also meant a more efficient protocol for VAM's production department, saving time and effort into preparing single units based on individual customer orders that requested optional equipment. The practice of packaging options was not limited to the base models. The three high-trim Americans were also offered with an optional package of all electric equipment, tilt column and air conditioning system. Engine displacement emblems in both base and high-trim models were removed from the rear quarter panels. Like all three high-trim models the year before, the three base models also obtained full size door panels covering the top portion of their doors with an exclusive design. Despite this, the rear sides (two-door) and the portions behind the rear doors (four door and wagon) remained the same as the years before, with exposed metal parts painted body color.

1982
The 1982 recession and currency devaluation in Mexico weakened the economy and hit the automotive market and industry, with VAM being no exception. The dire situation, coupled with a government decree banning the importation of automotive accessories deemed "luxurious and non-vital to the vehicle" took its toll in both standard and optional equipment of all car lines and marques sold in Mexico. All high-trim Americans for 1982 were no longer available with power door locks, power windows, power trunk release, power seats, tilt steering column, quartz digital clock, rear defroster, wheelcovers and AMC's chromed squared remote mirrors. If VAM and the rest of Mexican auto industry intended to continue to offer these items, they had to be either sourced or produced locally or be replaced with a close equivalent. While Mexican suppliers were able to reproduce some items, others had no alternative to being discontinued. Items that were standard for 1981 such as the remote controls for the door mirrors, the intermittent wipers, the reading dome light, and the vanity mirror were put on the options list as either individual accessories or all of them (except mirror controls) being included as a package with the order of the air conditioning system, continuing VAM's 1981 strategy of packaging options. The rest of the equipment was virtually unchanged from the year before. Despite this, there was a new optional accessory for the year, an AM/FM/stereo tape player radio. Due to the loss of the chromed squared design, high-trim Americans reverted to the cody-colored shell type mirrors used in the 1980 models, while the base models continued to use the manual oval chromed units seen in most VAM cars since 1970.

All three high-trim editions featured a new VAM-designed luxurious grille with a rectangular pattern, while the three base models used AMC's square-pattern design borrowed from U.S. market Eagle models, marking for the first time a different grille design for each trim level. The GFS, ECD, and DL models also got a set of plain VAM-designed bumper end caps with a horizontal chrome molding on the top side edge. The ones for the front bumper were the same size as the originals, while those of the rear bumper were some inches longer than their AMC counterparts, covering more of the body gap used for the bumper. Along with these, AMC's Eagle black nerfing strip design was also used in both bumpers. The headlight bezels changed to blacked-out units in their internal sections keeping the chromed surrounding areas. All-new aluminum road wheels with narrow chromed volcano hubcaps also replaced the previously imported Noryl wheel covers. A unique version of the year was the American ECD, which featured a lengthened and squared rear roofline with smaller and more rectangular C-pillar windows that had a smaller "ECD" sand-blasted logo at the bottom instead of at the center like the two years before. Other changes included black rear side window surrounds for the American DL wagon that were originally created by AMC for the Eagle models, while the American GFS had plain side window panels. What all six versions had in common was a new taillight treatment in which the previously silver-painted stripes and surrounds changed into blackout form. Also, the transparent front-end parking lights used since 1979 were replaced by new amber units in all models. Both versions of the three base models were the same as in 1981 except for the grille design, new door panels, new seat patterns and the absence of the quartz clock in the automatic cars. Mechanically, the greatest novelty came early in the year in the form of a new head design for the 282 six cylinder with smaller spark plug outlets and improved intake ports, still retaining the metal valve cover, while the automatic transmissions obtained wider gear ratios. Compression ratio rose from 8.0:1 to 8.5:1 for both engines.

1983
After the turmoil of 1982, Renault de México took over VAM from the Mexican government in February 1983. As with AMC, Renault was most interested in the Jeep line, VAM's production facilities, and its established dealer network. As soon as the agreement was finalized, Renault ordered the termination of VAM's passenger car line so it would not compete with its own products. VAM's 1983 models existed mainly to use up the highest possible amount of existing inventories, fulfilling previous agreements with sourcing companies and delivering the existing customer orders. The American line for 1983 soldiered on in a very limited form, which still included the two door sedan for this year that had been discontinued by AMC in 1982, becoming the last Concord two-door sedan ever produced.

The only true novelty for the year in regards to accessories and appearance being the new grille and headlight bezel designs. The external lines of both sets of parts changed from being vertical to diagonal from top to bottom until reaching the top back edge of the front bumper, creating a more aerodynamic look and practically covering up the gap between the bumper and the rest of the front end. Headlights and parking lights were the same units used in last year's models; the grille was characterized by a design of six horizontal rectangles consisting of two sets of three rectangles placed one in the left half of the grille and the other on the right half. Unlike the previous year, both the base and luxury models shared the same grille design like in the 1978-1981 models. Aside from these two items, the closest other accessory to being a novelty was the local reproduction of the luxury squared chromed mirror, characterized by having the VAM logo on the back near the mirror base where AMC's one originally was. This mirror was originally intended to allow VAM to offer once again remote mirrors with a luxury appearance in its top-end models, but in the end it became the standard unit in all 1983 VAM cars.

The American GFS and American ECD models were virtually not produced for the final year. Both sedan models existed as the base manual and semi-equipped automatic units, which this year got more equipped as a way to use up most of the existing stock of equipment. Regardless of the transmission, new additional standard equipment for the year included power brakes, power steering, and dual remote mirrors (without remote controls). Cars with manual transmissions had a parcel shelf with two courtesy lights and the set of eight-spoke sports steel wheels with blacked out volcano hubcaps as standard. On the other hand, the units with automatic transmission featured at no extra cost aluminum road wheels with chromed volcano hubcaps, the same high-trim upholstery door panels and seat designs as the previous GFS and ECD models along with their respective door armrest safety reflectors and dual rear ashtrays (single central ashtray on the rear of the front seat back on the four door), high-trim front hood edge molding and a central over-the-hood bright molding with a VAM ornament at the front edge. The two-door automatic models also had a reclining mechanism for their front seats and the rear seat had a fold-down center armrest concealed at the seat back. Despite their notably base model external appearance, the interior of 1983 VAM Americans sedans with the automatic transmission was close to what was found in the previous years GFS and ECD models. The only aspects that broke with this treatment being the AM monoaural radio, the two-speed wipers, passenger sunvisor without vanity mirror, round dome light and the 258 six cylinder engine aside from the lack of C-pillar and opera windows.

The American DL station wagon model was virtually the only high-trim American model to be available. For 1983, the base automatic and the basic DL were merged into a single version alongside the equipped DL and the base manual, creating three versions for the year unlike the four of the last two years. The mid-range version had the same equipment as the four-door sedan models with automatic transmission of the year including the 258 six cylinder engine, it was also called "American DL" and carried the same woodgrain panels and moldings that were never seen in the base automatics of the previous two years. The differences between the mid-range DL and the top-of-the-line DL are the presence of the AM/FM stereo radio with four speakers, reading dome light, lighted vanity mirror, intermittent wipers, air conditioning and the 282 six cylinder engine in the latter model. Virtually, the only way to tell a mid-range DL from a top-of-the-line DL from the outside is the presence of the plain luxurious bumper end cap designs and Eagle nerfing strips that VAM introduced in the 1982 top models on the higher-equipped wagon while the mid range one had the regular chrome bumpers without nerfing strips and the original bumper cap design. Both automatic sedans equipped with air conditioning also included the larger 282 engine and the five additional accessories of the top of the line DL wagon, being the closest spiritual successors to the ECD and GFS models. This also meant the only case of a base American sedan with the option of a factory air conditioning system; the previous models being limited to a universal adapted dealer-installed unit. The only factory optional accessories available that were always separated from edition equipment were the AM/FM stereo tape player radio, remote-controlled door mirrors, and electric antenna. Leftover 1983 VAM Americans were sold as 1984 models.

American Rally AMX
In 1978 and 1979, VAM offered a regular production performance model within the American line aside from the economy base models and luxury GFS/ECD/DL units. This was the American Rally AMX, a successor to VAM's 1975–1977 American Rally and being the Mexican equivalent of the 1978 AMC Concord AMX. In both years, the model served as the VAM's top-of-the-line sports product of the company, with the only possible exception of the limited edition 1979 American 06/S.

1978
In its first year, the American Rally AMX was cosmetically almost the same as its U.S. counterpart. Both versions shared the same rear louvers, fender extensions, front air dam, side stripe, body-colored bumpers with guards and nerfing strips, shell-type door mirrors, roof Targa band, and mesh-grating grille design with round parking lights and central AMX emblem. The only different characteristics of the Mexican vehicle were the inhouse five-spoke wheels with chromed volcano hubcaps and trim rings, the presence of original "Rally AMX" decals just under the regular side stripes (replacing AMC's lower body "AMX" design for the model), the "Rally" and "4.6" emblems, and the lack of the "Hornet in Flames" hood decal. Another visual difference took place in the midyear as VAM's customers mostly rejected the mesh grille design as "very simplistic and rough-looking". The company responded to the criticisms with an original grille design incorporating the rectangular parking lights placed vertically and between them, a set of three vertical lines (left, center, right), and a central horizontal line passing through them, behind this was a mesh grating half smaller in size as the original.

In the interior, both cars were far more different. The VAM car had woodgrain overlays over the front dashboard surfaces instead of brushed aluminum, a digital tachometer, Hurst T-shaped shifter, VAM logo over the horn button, a "Rally" emblem over the glove box door, reclining front bucket seats with a round border pattern on the fabric as well as on the side and door panels. In midyear, VAM replaced the round border pattern with a horizontal-line design in one or two tones due to criticism and rejection from customers. Mechanically, the model is restricted to only the  VAM  I6 engine with TREMEC 170-F four-speed manual transmission with Hurst linkage or optional Chrysler Torque Flyte A998 three-speed automatic transmission with a 3.31:1 rear differential gear ratio with both transmissions. Factory equipment included power front disk and rear drum brakes, power steering, front sway bar, heavy-duty springs and shocks, regular cooling system (rigid four-bladed fan, two-line radiator), as well as D70×14 radial tires.

1979
The American Rally AMX was carried over for 1979 with substantial cosmetic changes that gave the model a higher level of originality within VAM and pushed it away from AMC's 1978 original. The body featured all-new side decal designs in two tones that were mostly straight and surrounded the side protective rubber moldings. The portion under the rear side windows grew thicker and housed an "AMX over Rally" decal using the same typography and design as the previous model, the legend "AMX" on top of the "Rally" one. All glass frames and moldings, volcano hubcaps, door mirrors, rocker panels, and bumpers were blacked out. AMC's dual-quad headlight design with transparent parking lights was adopted alongside an in-house VAM sporty grille design with four horizontal bars shared with the Gremlin X and American 06/S models of the same year. Both bumpers were changed to the new smaller aluminum units with side end caps, bumper guards, and nerfing strips. A unique feature of this model is the radio antenna placed on top of the passenger's side rear quarter panel, instead of the top of the right front fender.

The model was mechanically the same as the previous model, except the engine's output was measured using the net rating system, which made it now  at 4,200 rpm. The interiors now included AMC's new center console design with a rear ashtray, armrest, as well as Rallye gauges along with AMC's shifter designs for both transmissions. The seat designs for the model were the same as in the second half of the year of the previous model year, while the door and side panels were completely remade with higher appointments of luxury in the form of the carpet inserts on the bottom portion. The presence of the rear ashtray within the center console eliminated the need for dual side ashtrays found in the 1978 models.

The American Rally AMX was discontinued at the end of the 1979 model year to make way for the new Spirit coupe-based Rally AMX for 1980. Unlike under AMC, it was the only version available for the Hornet/Concord hatchback body style in Mexico, meaning the base and DL models offered by AMC in 1978 and 1979 were not offered.

Rally Racing
The American Rally AMX participated in the competitions organized by the National Rallying Committee of Mexico (Comisión Nacional de Rallies) in 1978 with official support from VAM. The silver-painted unit was driven by Mexican pilot and team member Jorge Serrano, driving a prototype version of the "4.6/X" high-performance  I6 engine that was later used in the American 06/S and Rally GT models. The cars became the national champion in the make and navigator departments, while Ford de México's team captured the driver's championship. For the 1979 Rally Mexico season, VAM's team switched to two Gremlin X cars.

Racing 
Only three or four drivers in the country raced the AMC Concord.

Tom Reffner, who won sixty-seven features driving an AMC Javelin during the 1975 season, campaigned his 1978 AMX in races that included winning the April 8 ARTGO opener in 1979 at Wisconsin's Madison Capital Raceway with temperatures just above freezing. For the season, Reffner had 21 feature wins, and added 16 more in 1979 with the AMX, thus continuing an "outstanding" racing record in AMC cars from 1975 until a wreck at Elko in 1979.

An AMC Concord was entered in the 1978 World Challenge for Endurance Drivers. The car started the endurance race at the 6 Hours of Talladega Camel GT Challenge with 40 other cars, but ran for only one lap on February 4, 1978. The same car then ran the International Motor Sports Association (IMSA) Pepsi 6 Hour Champion Spark Plug Challenge at the Daytona International Speedway three days later and finished in 17th (out of 71 cars) with 130 laps. On March 9, 1978, the Concord placed 27th (out of 70 entered) with 162 laps racing the 6 Hour Champion Spark Plug Challenge at Road Atlanta.

A 1979 AMC Concord was campaigned on the west coast from 1978 to 1981 by Buzz Dyer. Power was provided by a Traco Engineering built AMC  V8 engine that was originally in the Penske AMC Matador that won the 1973 season-opening event at Riverside driven by Mark Donohue. The Concord raced in six Trans Am events, as well as International Motor Sports Association (IMSA) events with a GTO entry and several IMSA AC races. The car was in the following Kelly American Challenge races: the 1979 Road Atlanta and Mid-Ohio, the 1980 Golden State and in Portland, as well as the 1981 Sears Point and Portland events. On June 14, 1982, Buzz Dyer set a record 37-position improvement when he started in 48th place in his Concord and finished the Portland race in eleventh, a feat that stood in the SCCA NTB Trans-Am Series until the 1998 season. This Concord ran with other drivers in the SCCA GT-1 races all the way through 1990.

Experimental engines
The VAM Lerma version of the Concord served as a promotional and test vehicle for the Stirling engine. A 1980 four-door sedan was fitted with a P-40 engine and used to inform the public about the Stirling engine. Additionally, a 1979 AMC Spirit engineering test vehicle was also tested extensively to develop and demonstrate practical alternatives to the traditional engines. The tests demonstrated that the type of engine "could be developed into an automotive power train for passenger vehicles and that it could produce favorable results."

A 1980 AMC Concord served as the test vehicle in s conceptual design study of the automotive Improved Gas Turbine (IGT) powertrain. Working under a NASA contract for U.S. DOE's Division of Automotive Technology Development, Williams Research performed the design and analysis on the gas turbine engine, while AMC's AM General subsidiary did the vehicle installation studies, supplied the vehicle, transmission, drivetrain, and the typical car accessories. The two-door sedan used a dual-rotor gas turbine with variable power turbine nozzle, and a 3-speed automatic transmission for conventional rear-wheel-drive. Williams Research conducted all the performance and fuel economy analysis, with the turbine-powered Concord meeting expectations. The final report estimated that the IGT vehicle would have a 10% higher cost over the conventional piston engine, of which less than half of the cost penalty would be in the turbine engine, but the remainder would be the cost of adapting the existing production of vehicles and systems. However, fuel economy improvements, as well as reduced maintenance and repairs, would result in an overall life-cycle cost saving of 9% for the IGT vehicle.

Solargen Electric

Development
Battery powered AMC Concords were produced by Solargen Electric Motor Car Company during 1979 and 1980. The idea was developed by Steven J. Romer, a lawyer from Manhattan, who secured a United States Department of Energy (DOE) grant to build electric cars in 1979. The company also received incentives and vacant buildings from the city of Cortland, New York. Romer's previous negotiations included a promised restart of heavy-duty diesel truck production in 1977, along with a line of Subaru-bodied electric cars, using the original Brockway Motor Company facilities in Cortland.

Solargen's plan was to purchase Concord station wagon gliders from AMC and install batteries and direct current electric motors. The cars were to use more robust and resilient rechargeable lead crystal batteries that Romer bought from its inventors. The objective was for the Solargen Electric to be like a regular compact passenger automobile, instead of the unusual designs of the other electric vehicles on the market. The Solargen Electric was to be priced at $9,500, could be completely recharged with an extension cord on regular 110 house current in about six hours, or in half that time with 220 volts, while the future installation of 440 volt coin-operated recharging units in filling stations along roadways was claimed to provide recharging in minutes.

Production

Solargen began establishing dealerships, with thirty planned to be opened across the county by the end of October 1979. Problems were encountered with the advanced batteries, so the cars came with 20 regular lead-acid batteries underneath the hood and beneath the wagon's rear storage compartment. The Solargen actually provided a range of  after a 12-hour charge, and not able to reach highway speeds. The battery cars were "remarkably silent,.. the only noticeable sound being an electrical 'whine' intentionally engineered into the design to warn pedestrians during acceleration of up to 18 mph." (29 km/h) The cars carried a price tag of about $17,000.

The Solargen's short production run of converted Concord station wagons was halted in late December 1979 due to delays in receiving a "major component" according to company officials. Subsequently, Solargen launched a $2.2 billion lawsuit against AMC claiming that the automaker conspired and reneged on a binding agreement to supply 3,000 Concords without a powertrain at $3,000 each and then not only raised the price to $4,593 per glider, but also delayed their delivery. The lawsuit also alleged that price increase and the delays were the result of pressure from General Motors "for the purpose of sabotaging Solargen's prospects of commercial success" and that AMC was in a conspiracy with GM in violation of the Sherman Antitrust Act.

Legacy
Continuing the enterprise's unusual deals and history, Romer is believed to have gone to Sierra Leone in 1991, along with $25 million from 40 different clients. Romer was later convicted of defrauding $7 million from investors, as well as being handed a 22-year prison sentence. Some of the Solargen cars have been converted to run with regular AMC engines (including the "personal demo car of the owner of Solargen") and only a few of the original electric-powered Concord wagons still exist while some are not operational when they are sold.

Concords in film 
The 1978 film, The Betsy is a story about a family-owned automobile manufacturer and their hopes for a return to profitability on a new model. Actual 1978 Concords can be seen being completed and painted on AMC's assembly line in Kenosha, Wisconsin.

The film The Pursuit of Happyness used AMC Concords to help set the period in the 1980s.

American Motors was a sponsor of the TV show Wonder Woman in later seasons, and as a result, AMC cars such as Wonder Woman's 1978 Concord AMX were used by the main character and also given extensive "face time" on the series.

Epilogue 

The Concord was "AMC's last best shot at trying to stay in the market with an American-designed car" until it was discontinued after 1983. After building over 406,000 Concords, AMC dropped the line and made its successor the smaller front-wheel-drive Renault Alliance, a car that alienated many AMC loyalists.

The Concord was built on AMC's "junior" platform, which also served as the basis for the four-wheel-drive AMC Eagle, which according to author Don Sherman "pioneered the crossover SUV" and according to author Marty Padgett "predated a whole generation of crossover vehicles". The AMC Eagle remained in production until it was discontinued after Chrysler purchased AMC in the middle of the 1988 model year.

For 1987, AMC introduced the imported Medallion to replace the discontinued Concord, as well as the similarly sized, but poor-selling Renault 18-based 18i/Sportwagon, which had been sold at AMC dealerships from 1981 to 1986. The Medallion, like its 18i/Sportwagon predecessors, also failed to sell in large numbers, and Chrysler canceled the captive imports at the end of 1989.

In 1993, Chrysler introduced the LH platform series of full-size sedans that was based on and built in the same Brampton, Ontario factory as the AMC-developed and Renault-derived Eagle Premier. Significantly larger than the AMC Concord, flagship of the LH line was similarly named, the Chrysler Concorde.

References

External links 

 
 
 
 
 American Motors Owners Association
 AMC Rambler Club

Concord
Compact cars
Coupés
Hatchbacks
Sedans
Station wagons
Convertibles
1980s cars
Electric vehicles introduced in the 20th century
Rear-wheel-drive vehicles
Cars introduced in 1978